Elk Lake is a large lake located in Elk/Beaver Lake Regional Park in Saanich, British Columbia. Elk Lake and Beaver Lake are actually one lake as a shallow channel connects them.
Elk/Beaver lake was known as the "Freshwater Playground of Victoria" in its heyday, the 1930s and 1940s. However, with the completion of the Pat Bay highway in the 1950s, focus turned to environmentalism, and measures were taken to start restoring the park to its natural state and protecting it. In 1966 Elk/Beaver lake became a regional park.

References

External links

Greater Victoria Youth Rowing Society Youth School Rowing Club Southern Vancouver Island BC, District #63
State of Water Quality of Elk and Beaver Lakes 1986-1995
Saanich Peninsula area, Elk and Beaver Lakes water quality assessment and objectives 1992

Saanich, British Columbia
Lakes of British Columbia
Lake Land District